New Brunswick Innovation Foundation (NBIF) is an agency that seeks to promote entrepreneurship in the Canadian province of New Brunswick by making venture capital investments in startup companies and funding applied research to developing new intellectual property. An independent not-for-profit corporation, the Foundation has $120 million under management, leveraging $310 million more from other sources. The foundation is based in Fredericton, New Brunswick.

Investment areas 
The NBIF supports makes investments in research and development projects and early stage companies within the following strategic industries*:

Knowledge industry 
 Information and Communication Technologies: internet solutions/e-commerce, software development, system integration, e-learning, e-health, security solutions, new media, network technologies, wireless applications, communications
 Geomatics: hydrographic and ocean mapping, mineral mapping
 Engineering: computer, electronics, architectural, ocean technologies, medical

Life sciences 
 Biotechnology: bio-medical engineering, bio-pharmaceuticals, genomics, breeding and pest management, bio-informatics, crop science and bio-pesticides and bio-products.
 Marine Science: aquaculture, salmon physiology and shellfish ecology, equipment development, oceanography, fish health, genetic collection of marine life.
 Wood Science: forest protection, forest improvement, pulp and paper science, forest pest management, propagation/breeding, genetic collection of trees.

Advanced manufacturing 
 Plastics and rubbers: packaging, wraps, containers, vessels, signs, pipes and hoses.
 Metalworking: fabrications, building materials, transportation equipment, conveyors, harvesting equipment and containers.
 Electronics: communication devices, switches and circuits, sensors, probes, smart materials, gaming devices, nano.

Value-added natural resources 
 Agriculture : value-added products, food safety, new product development.
 Forestry: silviculture, wood composites, engineered building materials, furniture, paper and allied products.
 Minerals: value-added from metallic minerals such as lead and from industrial minerals, particularly limestone and potash, development of new exploration technologies targeting deeper seated mineral bodies, finding new methods of treating reactive acid tailings and ways of extending the life of present mines.
 Aquaculture and Fisheries: fish and shellfish, alternative species, value-added fish and seafood products.

Energy and environmental technologies 
 Energy Generation: alternate energy sources such as wind, solar, hydro or marine bio-fuel, geothermal.
 Energy Storage: fuel cells, advanced batteries, hybrid systems.
 Energy Infrastructure: expanded natural gas distribution, bio-fuel processing technologies
 Water and Waste Water: water treatment, conservation
 Air and Climate: emission control, clean-up/safety, monitoring or compliance, trading and offsets.
 Recycling and Waste: recycling, waste treatment, bio-remediation.
The examples provided are simply for information purposes and are not intended to be all-encompassing.

References

External links 
New Brunswick Innovation Foundation Official website

Foundations based in Canada
Science and technology in New Brunswick
2002 establishments in New Brunswick
Funding bodies of Canada
Organizations based in Fredericton